The Westcliff University (WU) is a private, for-profit university in Irvine, California. Founded in  1993, it offers bachelor, master's, and doctorate degrees as well as certificate programs and continuing education courses. WU is a California Benefit Corporation, obligating it to pursue the public benefit by always considering the impact of its business decisions on its employees, suppliers, the environment, and the community at large.

History 
Westcliff University was founded in 1993 with a focus on online education in the fields of business and education.

In 2019, a federal court approved Westcliff University's plan to purchase the Western State College of Law and revert it to for-profit status.  The ABA allowed continued accreditation under the ownership of Westcliff University in December 2019.

Campus 

The university moved to a new campus in 2018, located in the Von Karman Creative Campus area of Irvine, California. The new location expanded the university's campus space more than four times larger than the previous facility. The campus is centered by the main building housing classrooms, faculty offices, administrative services, and study areas as well as a multipurpose building  for athletics and recreation, career fairs, and other events.  In 2020, it moved to  the nearby Intersect Campus area of  Irvine.

Westcliff also holds in-person classes at Plaza Tower in Cerritos, California.

Academics
The university offers various online and hybrid programs focused on business, IT, and education fields, programs include: one-year certificates, bachelor's degrees, post-baccalaureate certificates, master's degrees, and doctorate degrees. The university is accredited by the Western Association of Schools and Colleges (WSCUC), Distance Education Accrediting Commission (DEAC), and Accreditation Council for Business Schools and Programs (ACBSP). It is also approved by California's Bureau for Private Postsecondary Education (BPPE).

Colleges and schools 

Westcliff University offers 21 areas of study and confers degrees from two colleges. The university is classified as a Special Focus Four-Year: Business & Management School by the Carnegie Classification of Institutions of Higher Education.  The university has a 10-to-1 student-faculty ratio and offers bachelor's degrees and master's degrees through its three colleges and one law school:
 College of Business
 College of Education
 College of Technology & Engineering
 Western State College of Law

Enrollment 
International students make up 89% of the university's undergraduate enrollment. As of Fall 2018, California residents account for 9% of the student population. 98% of undergraduate enrollment is categorized as full-time. Eighty-one percent of undergraduates are registered in online programs, 1% enrolled in hybrid programs, and 18% enrolled in on-campus programs.  The graduate curriculum is spread across the programs more evenly with 37% enrolled in online programs, 47% enrolled in hybrid coursework, and 16% in on-campus programs.

Athletics
The Westcliff athletic teams are called the Warriors. The university competed as an independent program until 2020 when it joined the National Association of Intercollegiate Athletics (NAIA) and the California Pacific Conference (Cal Pac) in March of that year, effective beginning the 2020–21 school year.

Westcliff competes in 25 intercollegiate varsity sports: Men's sports include baseball, basketball, beach volleyball, cross country, futsal, lacrosse, soccer, swimming & diving, tennis, track & field, volleyball and water polo; while women's sports include basketball, beach volleyball, cross country, futsal, lacrosse, soccer, softball, stunt, swimming & diving, tennis, track & field, volleyball and water polo. The university also sponsors a varsity ESports team.

Along with the move to the NAIA, the university announced further expansion of the athletic program with the addition of men's and women's tennis, men's and women's swimming and diving, men's and women's surfing, men's and women's water polo, softball and cheerleading.

See also 
Western State College of Law
King's College, Kathmandu

References

External links
 
 Official athletics website

1993 establishments in California
Private universities and colleges in California
Education in Irvine, California
Educational institutions established in 1993
California Pacific Conference schools